John Robert Clynes (27 March 1869 – 23 October 1949) was a British trade unionist and Labour Party politician. He was a Member of Parliament (MP) for 35 years, and as Leader of the Labour Party (1921–1922), led the party in its breakthrough at the 1922 general election.

He was the first Englishman to serve as leader of the Labour Party.

Early life
The son of an Irish labourer named Patrick Clynes, he was born in Oldham, Lancashire, and began working in a local cotton mill when he was ten years old. Aged sixteen, he wrote a series of articles about child labour in the textile industry, and the following year he helped form the Piercers' Union. He was mainly self-educated, although he went to night school after his day's work in the mill. His first book was a dictionary and then, by careful saving of coppers, he bought a Bible, Shakespeare's plays, and Bacon's essays. Later in life, he would amaze colleagues in meetings and in parliamentary debates by quoting verbatim from the Bible, Shakespeare, Milton and Ruskin. He married Mary Elizabeth Harper, a mill worker, in 1893.

Trade union and political involvement
In 1892, Clynes became an organiser for the Lancashire Gasworkers' Union and came in contact with the Fabian Society. Having joined the Independent Labour Party, he attended the 1900 conference where the Labour Representation Committee was formed; this committee soon afterwards became the Labour Party.

Clynes stood for the new party in the 1906 general election and was elected to Parliament for Manchester North East, becoming one of Labour's bright stars. In 1910, he became the party's deputy chairman.

Parliamentary career
During the First World War, Clynes was a supporter of British military involvement (in which he differed from Ramsay MacDonald), and, in 1917, became Parliamentary Secretary of the Ministry of Food Control in the Lloyd George coalition government. The next year, he was appointed Minister of Food Control and, at the 1918 general election, he was returned to Parliament for the Manchester Platting constituency.

Clynes became leader of the party in 1921 and led it through its major breakthrough in the 1922 general election. Before that election, Labour only had fifty-two seats in Parliament but, as a result of the election, Labour's total number of seats rose to 142. He was held in considerable respect and affection in the Labour Party and, although lacking the charisma of MacDonald, was a wily operator who believed all resources available should be used to advance the material of the working classes.

MacDonald had resigned as Labour leader in 1914, due to his wartime pacifism, and at the 1918 general election, he lost his seat. He did not return to the House of Commons for another four years. By that stage, MacDonald's pacifism had been forgiven. When the occupant of the Labour leadership had to be decided on through a vote of Labour parliamentarians, MacDonald narrowly defeated Clynes. Clynes was a critic of government policy towards the Irish population in the years after 1918, and attacked 'a recurring system of coercion' which had left Ireland "more angry and embittered . . . than ever'

Governmental office
When MacDonald became Prime Minister he made Clynes the party's leader in the Commons until the government was defeated in 1924. During the second MacDonald government of 1929–1931, Clynes served as Home Secretary. In that role, Clynes gained literary prominence when he explained in the Commons his refusal to grant a visa
to the Russian revolutionary Leon Trotsky, then living in exile in Turkey, who had been invited by the Independent Labour Party to give a lecture in Britain. Clynes had then been immortalised by the scathing criticism of his concept of the right to asylum, voiced by Trotsky in the last chapter of his autobiography "My Life" entitled "The planet without visa".

In 1931, Clynes sided with Arthur Henderson and George Lansbury, against MacDonald's support for austerity measures to deal with the Great Depression. Clynes split with MacDonald when the latter left Labour to form a National Government. In the 1931 election, Clynes was one of the casualties, losing his Manchester Platting seat. Nevertheless, he regained this constituency in 1935, and then remained in the House of Commons until his retirement ten years later, at the 1945 general election.

Retirement and death
After retiring, Clynes was living in very straitened circumstances, with no other income than trade union pension of £6 per week. This pension debarred him from the Commons Ex-Members Fund. Doctors' and nursing fees in respect of his invalid wife had hit him heavily. MPs opened a fund to help and raised about £1,000. Thus, after a lifetime spent in advancing the material conditions of the people, he died in relative poverty in October 1949. His wife died a month later.

Honours
 He was sworn in as a member of the Privy Council of the United Kingdom in 1918, giving him the Honorific Title "The Right Honourable" for Life.
 He was awarded the Freedom of the Borough of Oldham on 9 January 1946.
 He received the Honorary degree of Doctor of Civil Law (DCL) from the University of Durham and the University of Oxford.
 John Clynes Court, a social housing development in Putney, south west London, is named after him.

Notes

References

Further reading
 Clynes, J.R. Memoirs (1937)
 Edward, George From Mill Boy to Minister (1918)
 Judge, Tony. J.R. Clynes: A Political Life (2016)

External links
 
 

1869 births
1949 deaths
People from Oldham
Lords Privy Seal
Members of the Privy Council of the United Kingdom
British Secretaries of State
Leaders of the Labour Party (UK)
Secretaries of State for the Home Department
Labour Party (UK) MPs for English constituencies
Independent Labour Party MPs
Independent Labour Party National Administrative Committee members
GMB (trade union)-sponsored MPs
Presidents of the GMB (trade union)
UK MPs 1906–1910
UK MPs 1910
UK MPs 1910–1918
UK MPs 1918–1922
UK MPs 1922–1923
UK MPs 1923–1924
UK MPs 1924–1929
UK MPs 1929–1931
UK MPs 1935–1945
Chairs of the Labour Party (UK)
Chatham House people